Rheingauviertel is a borough of the city of Wiesbaden, Hesse, Germany. With over 22,000 inhabitants, it is one of the most-populated of Wiesbaden's boroughs. It is located in the centre of the city. It is named after the wine region Rheingau to the west of Wiesbaden.

References

External links 
 Official Wiesbaden-Rheingauviertel website (in German)

Boroughs of Wiesbaden